John Parkin (9 June 1877 – 19 August 1951) was an Australian rules footballer who played with Geelong in the Victorian Football League (VFL).

Notes

External links 

1877 births
1951 deaths
Australian rules footballers from Victoria (Australia)
Geelong Football Club (VFA) players
Geelong Football Club players
People educated at Geelong Grammar School